Hong Kong competed at the 2004 Summer Olympics in Athens, Greece, from 13 to 29 August 2004. It was the territory's thirteenth appearance at the Olympics and, at the opening ceremony, its team was the last to enter the stadium before the host nation because of the use of the Greek alphabet.

The Sports Federation and Olympic Committee of Hong Kong, China sent a total of 32 athletes to the Games, 18 women and 14 men, to compete in 10 sports, surpassing only a single athlete short of the record from Sydney four years earlier. For the first time in Olympic history, Hong Kong was represented by more female than male athletes. Thirteen of them had previously competed in Sydney, including track cyclist Wong Kam Po, Mistral windsurfer and 1996 Olympic champion Lee Lai Shan, and backstroke swimmer Sherry Tsai, who eventually became the nation's flag bearer in the opening ceremony.

Hong Kong left Athens with a silver medal feat from table tennis players Ko Lai Chak and Li Ching in the men's doubles tournament.

Medalists

Athletics 

Hong Kong athletes achieved qualifying standards in the following athletics events (up to a maximum of 3 athletes in each event at the 'A' Standard, and 1 at the 'B' Standard).

Men
Track & road events

Badminton

Cycling

Road

Track
Omnium

Fencing

Men

Women

Rowing

Hong Kong rowers qualified the following boats:

Men

Qualification Legend: FA=Final A (medal); FB=Final B (non-medal); FC=Final C (non-medal); FD=Final D (non-medal); FE=Final E (non-medal); FF=Final F (non-medal); SA/B=Semifinals A/B; SC/D=Semifinals C/D; SE/F=Semifinals E/F; R=Repechage

Sailing

Hong Kong sailors have qualified one boat for each of the following events.

Men

Women

M = Medal race; OCS = On course side of the starting line; DSQ = Disqualified; DNF = Did not finish; DNS= Did not start; RDG = Redress given

Shooting 

Hong Kong has qualified a single shooter.

Women

Swimming 

Hong Kong swimmers earned qualifying standards in the following events (up to a maximum of 2 swimmers in each event at the A-standard time, and 1 at the B-standard time):

Men

Women

Table tennis

Eight Hong Kong table tennis players qualified for the following events.

Men

Women

Triathlon

Hong Kong has qualified a single triathlete.

See also
 Hong Kong at the 2002 Asian Games
 Hong Kong at the 2004 Summer Paralympics

References

External links
Official Report of the XXVIII Olympiad
HK Olympic Committee 

Nations at the 2004 Summer Olympics
2004
Summer Olympics